Al-Fāw (sometimes transliterated as Fao) is a port town on Al-Faw Peninsula in Iraq near the Shatt al-Arab and the Persian Gulf. The Al Faw Peninsula is part of the Basra Governorate.

History

The town lies at the south-east end of the Al-Faw Peninsula on the right bank of the Shatt al-Arab, a few kilometres away from the Persian Gulf.

The town, as well as the whole Faw Peninsula, was the scene of armed conflict during World War I, the Iran–Iraq War, the Persian Gulf War, and the Iraq War due to its strategic position at the entrance of the Shatt al-Arab.

The city was extensively damaged during the Iraq-Iran war, but in 1989 it was rebuilt in four months to a completely new city plan.

See also
 Grand Faw Port
 Al-Faw Palace
 Umm Qasr

References

External links

 Iraq Image - Al-Faw Satellite Observation

Faw
Faw
District capitals of Iraq
Port cities and towns of the Persian Gulf